The Bay Coast Railroad  operated the former Eastern Shore Railroad line between Pocomoke City, Maryland, and Norfolk, Virginia. The railroad interchanged with the Delmarva Central Railroad in Pocomoke City and Norfolk Southern in Norfolk; the interchange in Pocomoke City had been with Norfolk Southern prior to December 2016, when the Delmarva Central Railroad leased  of Norfolk Southern track on the Delmarva peninsula.

History

Construction of a rail line from Pocomoke City to Cape Charles was completed on October 25, 1884, and operated as the New York, Philadelphia and Norfolk Railroad (NYP&N). Its founder, Alexander Johnston Cassatt (12/08/1839 to 12/08/1906), designed a barge large enough to carry 18 railcars. His barges provided the new railroad with its connection across the Chesapeake Bay to Norfolk by April 1885. The railroad's co-founder, coal magnate William Lawrence Scott, financed construction of the new town of Cape Charles in 1884 at the point where the railroad's northern section met the Chesapeake Bay. From its inception, the NYP&N operated profitably and contributed to an economic boom on the Delmarva peninsula that continued until the Great Depression. By 1928, The Pennsylvania Railroad had taken over the NYP&N's operations and were looking for a faster route to the port to interchange with the Norfolk & Western. So in 1929 the PRR built the little creek yard in the little creek area of Virginia Beach near the Norfolk/Virginia Beach line. This small but impressive yard also had a float bridge for carfloats carrying passengers and mixed freight across the Chesapeake Bay from Cape Charles and places farther north such as Philadelphia and New York. The PRR also had a small shop building next to the yard (which is still is standing and in use as of 2018) for repairing locomotives. This new route supposedly saved the Pennsy 25 miles of carfloat travel from Cape Charles to Norfolk.

After World War II, railroad passenger use declined in favor of the automobile. Passenger service on the NYP&N south of Delmar, Delaware at the Maryland-Delaware border ended on January 12, 1958.

In an effort to preserve freight rail service on the Eastern Shore of Virginia, Northampton and Accomack counties formed the Accomack-Northampton Transportation District Commission. The commission purchased the rail line in 1976 and selected Virginia and Maryland Railroad Company as its operator. Eastern Shore Railroad, Inc. replaced Virginia and Maryland as the operator in 1981. In 2005, Cassatt Management, LLC was selected as operator and the railroad acquired its current name.

Operations
BCR had three distinct operating areas. The  northern portion of its rail system connects with the Delmarva Central Railroad in Pocomoke City (north) and the system's car float in Cape Charles, Virginia. A car float, crossing  of the Chesapeake Bay from Cape Charles to Norfolk, comprises the middle portion. The southern end of the system is a terminal track around Little Creek, Virginia, connecting with Norfolk Southern Railway, CSX Transportation, and the Norfolk and Portsmouth Belt Line Railroad.

At the regular meeting of the Accomack-Northampton Transportation District Commission held at the Eastern Shore Chamber of Commerce Building, Melfa, Virginia, on Monday, November 6, 2017, at 5:30 p.m., BCR President Alex Parry "reported that the DCP traffic (butane)
has been lost from the Little Creek side; however, he is hopeful that other new traffic will be realized to fill the void." DCP traffic amounted to approximately 75% of the carloads handled by the railroad. In January 2018 the BCR suffered another loss when customer Bayshore Concrete announced it was putting its Cape Charles plant up for sale in the wake of declining business.

Chesapeake Bay car float
BCR used two tug boat-guided railroad car floats of 25 and 15 car capacity to link the  water route across the Chesapeake Bay between Cape Charles and Norfolk — using the north and south terminals of the now defunct Little Creek-Cape Charles Ferry. This car float operation had been in continuous service since April 1885, and was one of only two remaining in the United States, the other being New York New Jersey Rail, LLC. In late March 2014 VP for operations Larry LeMond stated the railroad had not run the barge for more than a year and a half and had no intention to resume the service. He also stated that all of the railroad's traffic comes into Pocomoke City to the north and the company operates every other day. An article in Delmarva Now online dated January 14, 2019 noted that the minutes of the Accomack-Northampton Transportation District Commission meeting of December 4, 2018 stated, "The rail car barge Nandua has been sold." The buyer, Iron Planet, seeks to sell it for $200,000.

Bay Creek Railway
In 2007, Bay Creek Railway began operating a self-propelled dining car along BCR track, making one- to two-hour round trips from Cape Charles. This passenger excursion service used a restored interurban railcar built in 1913 by St. Louis Car Company. It originally served the former Texas Electric Railway in Dallas, Texas as car number 316. When Texas Electric ceased operating in 1948, its fleet of interurban railcars was sold for salvage. Car number 316 was used as a cabin at a ranch in Fort Worth, Texas until its restoration for the Bay Creek Railway.  By December 21, 2011, the car was listed for sale on the Ozark Mountain Railcar equipment broker website. The initial asking price was $260,000, later reduced to $205,000. The dining car was eventually sold, loaded onto a flat bed trailer and departed Cape Charles on March 11, 2014.? It is now on the Wisconsin Great Northern Railroad, a tourist line in Trego, Wisconsin.

Locomotive Roster

Note: No. 400 was acquired by the Minnesota-based Northern Lines Railway and repainted in Cascade green by Mid-America Car in Kansas City, Missouri.

Note: Both GP10 2000 and 2001 were out of service by the time of the railroad's closure. 2000 had a set of trucks swapped with GP38 2014 in August 2013 and appeared to be missing a compressor. 2001 was missing a set of trucks. No. 2001, dormant for over a decade, was cut up for scrap on January 18, 2019.

Note: In August 2018 leased locomotive LLPX 2014 was moved to the Cape May Seashore Lines in New Jersey.

Note: Both MRS1 locomotives, out of service for many years, were scrapped on site in 2011.

End of operations

As of May 18, 2018, the Bay Coast Railroad ran their last train before ceasing operations. Leased locomotive LLPX 2014 was out of service so the BCR leased an EMD GP11 numbered 2005 from the Delmarva Central Railroad to pull the last train to the interchange with the DCR. LLPX 2014 was moved "dead in tow."

A document filed on May 17, 2018, with the Surface Transportation Board by the Delmarva Central Railroad read in part:

"Pursuant to regulations of the Surface Transportation Board ("STB") at 49 C.F.R. § 1150.42(e), Delmarva Central Railroad Company ("DCR"), a Class III rail carrier, hereby gives notice to employees of Cassatt Management, LLC d/b/a Bay Coast Railroad ("BCR") that as soon as May 29, 2018, DCR intends to lease and thereafter operate a line of railroad owned by Canonie Atlantic Co. ("CAC") on behalf of the Accomack-Northampton Transportation District Commission and currently leased to BCR extending from the connection with DCR' s line (leased from Norfolk Southern Railway Company) at approximately milepost 30.9 five hundred feet south of Second Street in Pocomoke City, Maryland to approximately milepost 45.7 at the south side of Taylor Street in Hallwood, Virginia, a distance of approximately 14.8 miles (the "Line"). DCR's operations will replace those currently conducted on the Line by BCR."

An exemption notice to change railroad operators will be filed with the STB around May 21, 2018. As most or all BCR rail traffic on the line is located on the northern end between Pocomoke City and Hallwood, Virginia, the DCR will take over operations where there are remaining customers. The line between Hallwood and Cape Charles will be abandoned. Railpace magazine reported the Buckingham Branch Railroad will take over BCR operations on the Norfolk side. An article in Trains News Wire, however, stated that Norfolk Southern Railway was in negotiations to take over Norfolk side operations. The DCR began operations on the former Bay Coast Railroad between Pocomoke City and Hallwood in June 2018.

A filing with the STB dated June 13, 2018 stated, in part:

Pursuant to regulations of the Surface Transportation Board ("STB") at 49 C.F.R. § l 150.42(e), Buckingham Branch Railroad Company ("BB"), a Class III rail carrier, hereby gives notice to employees of Cassatt Management, LLC d/b/a Bay Coast Railroad ("BCR") that, as soon as federal regulatory authorization permits, BB intends to lease and commence operations over lines of railroad (collectively, the "Lines") owned by: (a) Canonie Atlantic Co. ("CAC") on behalf of the Accomack-Northampton Transportation District Commission; and (b) Norfolk Southern Railway Company ("NSR"). The Lines are currently leased to, and operated by, BCR. 
Specifically, the CAC-owned portion of Lines (which BCR leases and operates) are as follows: 
Between milepost 95.0 at Little Creek (Virginia Beach), VA, and milepost 97.6 at Camden Heights (Norfolk), VA. The NSR-owned portion of the Lines (which BCR also leases and operates) are as follows:
Between milepost SN 6.7 at Diamond Springs (Virginia Beach) VA and milepost SN 2.5 at Coleman Place (Norfolk), VA. 
A notice of exemption to authorize a change in operator from BCR to BB will be filed with the STB on or shortly after June 13, 2018, in Docket No. FD 36202.

In August 2018 the non-profit New York, Philadelphia & Norfolk Railroad Resurrection, Ltd., was chartered and met with the Accomack-Northampton Transportation District Commission and Canonie Atlantic Co. on November 6, 2018, in Melfa, Virginia. The NYP&N seeks to set up an operating railroad museum using the dormant BCR tracks.

By the end of January 2019 five cars were moved from the Cape Charles railroad yard eastward to a point beyond the hump adjacent to the museum. The move also include BCR 2000, the remaining BCR locomotive, and the work was performed by Coastal Railroad Construction, Inc of Portsmouth and paid for by the Cape Charles Historical Society. The rail yard is being dismantled to allow for redevelopment of the land and some of the rolling stock will be put on display at the Cape Charles Museum and Visitor Center. Remaining rolling stock, such as flatcars and ex-Southern Railway gondolas built in the 1930s and 1940s, is being offered for donation to railroad museums.

An article in Railway Track & Structures dated July 2, 2019, stated that Cassatt Management LLC planned to file to abandon the line. Conversion to a rail-trail is under consideration. This was followed by a filing with the STB on July 15, 2019. The proposal to establish an operating railroad museum has appeared to have withered and there's no mention of it in the abandonment filing, nor does the website of the New York, Philadelphia & Norfolk Railroad Resurrection, Ltd., show any meetings past the one on February 13, 2019.

An article in the Shore Daily News dated April 27, 2021, noted that track removal had begun in Bloxom and "[t]he action belies any hope that track could be rehabilitated to extend railroad service south of the current terminus in Hallwood.

See also

 Train ferry: United States for a list of current and former car floats and train ferries

References

Defunct Maryland railroads
Defunct Virginia railroads